Reinertsen is a civil engineering, construction, and petroleum industry supply company based in Trondheim, Norway.  It was established in 1946 and remains family-owned. Its CEO is Erik Reinertsen and 
chairman is Torkil R. Reinertsen. In 2011, Reinertsen had a revenue of €400 million and 2,100 employees. It has offices in Trondheim, Orkanger, Oslo, Bergen,  Gothenburg, Stockholm, Murmansk (Russia) and Szczecin (Poland).

References

Construction and civil engineering companies of Norway
Companies based in Trondheim
Construction and civil engineering companies established in 1946
Norwegian companies established in 1946